Music From And Inspired By The Motion Picture Save The Last Dance 2 is the soundtrack to the film Save the Last Dance 2, a collaboration between MTV and Paramount. 

Def Jam recording artist Ne-Yo served as co-executive producer for the album, penning most of the original recordings on the soundtrack including the single worthy “Watch You Dance”. 

The set features some of today’s hottest R&B artists, including Joe, Rihanna, Ruben Studdard, Cassie, T-Pain, Pitbull, Ghostface Killah, Ryan Toby (formerly of City High,) as well as newcomers Debreca, Noel, Jalen, Jaiden, Candace Jones, and Boxie. Mass Appeal Entertainment is distributed through Fontana Distribution, a division of Universal Music Group.

Track listing
Music From And Inspired By The Motion Picture Save The Last Dance 2:
"Dance Floor" by T-Pain – 3:42
"Clap for That" by Noel feat. Ghostface Killah – 3:23
"Watch You Dance" by  Ne-Yo– 3:07
"Just My Thang" by Ryan Toby – 3:05
"The Hotness " by Rihanna feat. Shontelle – 3:11 
"Dance Alone" by Debreca – 3:43 
"It’s On You'" by Joe – 3:25 
"Kiss Me" by Cassie – 4:08 
"All I Need" by Jalen – 3:28
"Feel Beautiful" by Ruben Studdard  – 3:27
"You and Me" by Candace Jones – 3:52
"Bridging the Gap" by Boxie  – 3:34
"Escape" by Jaiden – 4:04

Trivia
Ne-Yo wrote "Watch You Dance," "It's On You," "All I Need," "Feel Beautiful," and "Bridging the Gap."

References                 

2000s film soundtrack albums
2006 soundtrack albums